Francis Henry Gresson (18 February 1868 – 31 January 1949) was an English cricketer active from 1887 to 1901 who played for Oxford University and Sussex. He was born in Worthing and was educated at Winchester College and Oriel College, Oxford and died in Eastbourne. He appeared in 47 first-class matches as a lefthanded batsman who bowled left arm fast medium. He was a Cricket blue at Oxford between 1887-89. His appearances with Sussex were limited by his job as a schoolmaster and he played no county cricket between 1890-99. He scored 1,241 runs with a highest score of 114 and took 30 wickets with a best performance of five for 50.

Notes

1868 births
1949 deaths
English cricketers
Sussex cricketers
People educated at Winchester College
Alumni of Oriel College, Oxford
Oxford University cricketers
Oxford and Cambridge Universities cricketers
Sportspeople from Worthing